Closer to the Flame is a 1989 album by Welsh rock musician Dave Edmunds. The album was Edmunds' first studio album in five years, and his only release for Capitol Records.

The album reached #146 in the United States, and the single "King of Love" hit #68 in the UK; this was the last chart appearance in America to date. However, in the UK Edmunds had a top 40 album best of in 2008.

"King of Love" features guest appearances by two of the Stray Cats: Brian Setzer contributes background vocals, and Lee Rocker plays upright bass.

The album's final track, "Stay With Me Tonight", had previously appeared on the soundtrack to the 1987 Michael J. Fox movie Light of Day.

It was recorded at Capitol Studios, Hollywood, California, and Ardent Studios Memphis, Tennessee.

Reviews
Although not considered to be one of Edmunds’ best albums, it has been generally well received by critics. Entertainment Weekly’s Greg Sandow enthused, "I’m trying to think of someone who wouldn’t love this album. Manuel Noriega? Right from the start, the music goes down like good whiskey, with a big, deep sound that warms the pit of your gut.” The Washington Post wrote that the "vocals never make the emotional connection that Presley and Lewis once made (and that Costello and Parker still make). As a result, Closer to the Flame is a fine example of pop craftsmanship rather than a cathartic experience."

Track listing
 "Closer to the Flame" (Fontaine Brown, Scott Mathews, Ron Nagle)
 "Fallin' Through a Hole" (Michael Lanning)
 "Don't Talk to Me" (Mickey Jupp)
 "Every Time I See Her" (Rick Bell, Michael Lanning)
 "Stockholm" (Chris East, Mickey Jupp)
 "King of Love" (Mark Johnson)
 "I Got Your Number" (Al Anderson, John Hiatt, Fred Koller)
 "Never Take the Place of You" (Al Anderson)
 "Sincerely" (Fontaine Brown)
 "Test of Love" (Billy Burnette, Dan Navarro)
 "Stay With Me Tonight" (Dave Edmunds, John David)

Personnel 
Dave Charles – Percussion, Drums, Engineer
Phil Chen – Bass
Crispin Cioe – Horn
Dave Edmunds – Guitar, Keyboards, Vocals, Background Vocals, Producer
Robert Funk – Horn
Jack Hale – Horn
Arno Hecht – Horn
Jim Horn – Horn
Wayne Jackson – Horn
Leslie Ann Jones – Engineer
Jim Keltner – Drums
Chuck Leavell – Keyboards
"Hollywood" Paul Litteral – Horn
Andrew Love – Horn
Lee Rocker – Bass
Brian Setzer – Background Vocals

References 

Dave Edmunds albums
Capitol Records albums
1990 albums
Albums produced by Dave Edmunds